Middlebury may refer to:

In education:
Middlebury College, a private liberal-arts college in Middlebury, Vermont

Towns:
Middlebury, Connecticut
Middlebury, Illinois
Middlebury, Indiana
Middlebury, New York
Middlebury, Ohio
Middlebury, Vermont
Middlebury (CDP), Vermont, the main settlement in the town

Townships:
 Middlebury Township, Elkhart County, Indiana
 Middlebury Township, Michigan
 Middlebury Township, Knox County, Ohio
 Middlebury Township, Pennsylvania

Unincorporated communities
 Middlebury, Wisconsin